The championship stage of the 2012–13 CONCACAF Champions League was played from March 5 to May 1, 2013. A total of eight teams competed in the championship stage.

Qualified teams
The winners of each of the eight groups in the group stage qualified for the championship stage.

Seeding
The qualified teams were seeded 1–8 in the championship stage according to their results in the group stage.

Format
In the championship stage, the eight teams played a single-elimination tournament. Each tie was played on a home-and-away two-legged basis. The away goals rule was used if the aggregate score was level after normal time of the second leg, but not after extra time, and so a tie was decided by penalty shoot-out if the aggregate score was level after extra time of the second leg.

Bracket
The bracket of the championship stage was determined by the seeding as follows:
Quarterfinals: Seed 1 vs. Seed 8 (QF1), Seed 2 vs. Seed 7 (QF2), Seed 3 vs. Seed 6 (QF3), Seed 4 vs. Seed 5 (QF4), with seeds 1–4 hosting the second leg
Semifinals: Winner QF1 vs. Winner QF4 (SF1), Winner QF2 vs. Winner QF3 (SF2), with winners QF1 and QF2 hosting the second leg
Finals: Winner SF1 vs. Winner SF2, with winner SF1 hosting the second leg

Quarterfinals
The first legs were played on March 5–7, 2013, and the second legs were played on March 12–13, 2013.

First legs: All times U.S. Eastern Standard Time (UTC−5); Second legs: All times U.S. Eastern Daylight Time (UTC−4)

First leg

Second leg

Monterrey won 4–2 on aggregate.

Seattle Sounders FC won 3–2 on aggregate.

Santos Laguna won 3–1 on aggregate.

Los Angeles Galaxy won 4–1 on aggregate.

Semifinals
The first legs were played on April 2–3, 2013, and the second legs were played on April 9–10, 2013.

All times U.S. Eastern Daylight Time (UTC−4)

First leg

Second leg

Santos Laguna won 2–1 on aggregate.

Monterrey won 3–1 on aggregate.

Finals

The first leg was played on April 24, 2013, and the second leg was played on May 1, 2013.

All times U.S. Eastern Daylight Time (UTC−4)

First leg

Second leg

Monterrey won 4–2 on aggregate.

References

External links

2